The following is a list of characters who first appeared in the Channel 4 soap opera Hollyoaks in 2002, by order of first appearance. Hollyoaks is a long running Channel 4 soap opera in the United Kingdom. This year saw the introduction of the Dean family as an extension to current cast member Steph Dean's family.

Norman Sankofa

Norman Sankofa is a fictional character on the Channel 4 British television soap opera Hollyoaks. He was played by actor Jamie Luke between 2002–2004.

Norman is Theo Sankofa's younger brother. As a schoolchild, Norman was left homeless after Theo's death, a fact he hid for many months from the other Hollyoaks residents. Jack Osborne eventually befriended Norman and took him into his home, much to the annoyance of Jack's son, Darren, who Norman consequently had many run-ins with. After his A-levels, Norman started a brief relationship with Zara Morgan, only to vanish to train as a policeman, following in Jack's footsteps.

Charlie Green

Charlie Green is the son of Anna Green and Alex Bell. Alex initially thinks he is infertile but Anna becomes pregnant. On New Year's Day Anna gives birth. Alex convinces her to keep Charlie despite her plans to put him up for adoption. Anna has an affair with Max Cunningham and later moves in with him, taking Charlie with her. Alex tries to move to Hong Kong and take Charlie but Anna catches him at the airport and convinces him to give Charlie back. Max and Anna split up and Charlie and Anna move back to Charlie's grandmother's house.

Kristian Hargreaves

Kristian Hargreaves is a fictional character from the British Channel 4 soap opera Hollyoaks, played by Max Brown between 2002 and 2004.

Cameron Clark

Cameron Clark is a fictional character from Hollyoaks, played by Ben Gerrard. The character made his first on-screen appearance on 4 September 2002. Cameron remained in the show for four years.

Gerrard originally auditioned for the role of Jake Dean but was unsuccessful and was later recalled to play Cameron instead. Cameron was Gerrard's first professional acting role. He remained in the show for four years.

Cameron is characterised as a "polite and affectionate" student. The official Hollyoaks website described the character as being "blessed with a rather dull reputation", he also suffers from depression which became apparent following his completion of school, which culminates in a suicide attempt.

Cameron makes his first appearance at Hollyoaks Comprehensive as something of a heartthrob; Abby Davies (Helen Noble), Steph Dean (Carley Stenson), and Zara Morgan (Kelly Greenwood) are just a few who instantly fall for Cameron. Lisa Hunter (Gemma Atkinson) is the only one who succeeds in capturing his attention, however. The pair begin to date, but it ends when Lisa becomes obsessed with Kristian Hargreaves. Lisa dumps Cameron for Kristian and labels Cameron as ‘dull’ and soon Cameron has a reputation for being boring.

Cameron goes on to join a band with Lee Hunter (Alex Carter), David "Bombhead" Burke (Lee Otway) and Norman Sankofa (Jamie Luke), called 'The X Factor', which never quite recover after Lee uses explicit lyrics during the performance for a christening at The Dog in The Pond. Cameron's ambition had always been to be a musician, but his parents pressure him to become a doctor, especially after he is offered a place to study medicine at a London university. Deeply confused and depressed, Cameron attempts suicide, but Bombhead and Sam Owen (Louis Tamone) arrive in time to save him. Both his friends and parents understand and support Cameron while he decides to take a music course at Hollyoaks Community College.

At college, he falls for new tenant Bella Manning (Kim Bourelle); the pair get along, but nothing becomes of it, as she had left HCC. By some bizarre turn of circumstance, Cameron catches the eye of Steph. Eventually the pair become an unlikely couple, and Cameron is seemingly happy.

After the few months, however, he begins to act strangely; he avoids his friends, isolates himself from the outside world, and becomes fixated on cleanliness and order. Cameron faces the prospect of losing Steph rather than admitting he needs help. Eventually he goes to a doctor to discover he has obsessive-compulsive disorder, and Steph supports him through his ordeal. As he gets better, Steph arranges for Cameron to join a band, which he is delighted to do—until he learns that it is going to be across Europe. He tells Steph he is prepared to stay, but she knows how much music means to him, and persuades him to join the band. Cameron says his goodbyes to her, and makes his exit away from The Dog in The Pond to Europe in a bid to make it as a musician.

A reporter from the Sunday Mail compared Cameron to the reclusive American businessman Howard Hughes because of his OCD. They added that "his obsession with germs takes over his life."

Ellie Mills

Eleanor Jane "Ellie" Mills (née Hunter) is a fictional character from the long-running Channel 4 soap opera Hollyoaks, played by Sarah Baxendale. She first appeared in 2002 and made her final appearance in 2005.

Debbie Dean

Debra "Debbie" Dean is a fictional character from the British Channel 4 soap opera Hollyoaks, played by Jodi Albert. She first appeared in 2002, before Albert quit the role in 2004. She made her final appearance during 2005, before making a brief return in 2006.

Craig Dean

Craig Dean is a fictional character from the long-running British Channel 4 soap opera Hollyoaks, played by Guy Burnet. Burnet has won many of Britain's most prestigious acting awards for this role. After his eventful departure from the series in September 2007, he returned to the show on 3 September 2008 in a bid to secure his sunset ending with John Paul McQueen, in which he was successful. He was also featured in the new spin-off show Hollyoaks Later in November 2008.

The character has been called one of Hollyoaks most iconic characters.

Jake DeanJake Dean is a fictional character from the British Channel 4 soap opera Hollyoaks, played by Kevin Sacre. Sacre portrayed the character between 2002 and 2008, before making a return on 5 October 2009. In March 2010, Sacre was axed from the series by Paul Marquess during his major revamp and cast cull. Jake made his last appearance on 6 August 2010.

Frankie OsborneFrancine "Frankie" Osborne (née Wallace, previously Dean) is a fictional character from the British Channel 4 soap opera Hollyoaks, played by Helen Pearson. She made her first on-screen appearance on 9 October 2002. She is part of the Dean family.

Johnno DeanJohn "Johnno" Dean''' is a fictional character from the long-running Channel 4 British television soap opera Hollyoaks'', played originally by Mark Powley. He first appeared in October 2002, and from April 2003 was replaced by Colin Wells until his exit in July 2005.

References

, Hollyoaks
2002